Sam Abell (born 1945 in Sylvania, Ohio) is an American photographer known for his frequent publication of photographs in National Geographic. 

Sam Abell's love of photography began due to the influence of his father who was a geography teacher who ran a photography club. In his book The Photographic Life, Abell mentions a photograph he made while on an outing with his father, a photograph that subsequently won a small prize in a photo contest. He credits that prize as being a major influence on the direction his life would take. Abell was the photographer and co-editor for his high school yearbook and newspaper.

Abell graduated from the University of Kentucky in Lexington where he majored in English, minored in Journalism, and was the editor of the Kentuckian Yearbook. He is also a teacher, an artist and an author.

Abell received an honorary Doctor of Letters degree from the University of Toledo in 2009.

Sam Abell's book The Life of a Photograph is one of three volumes begun in 2000 with Seeing Gardens. It was followed in 2002 with The Photographic Life.

Publications

Publications by Sam Abell
Amazonia, Sam Abell, 2010 
The Life of A Photograph, Sam Abell, 2008 
Seeing Gardens (National Geographic), Sam Abell, 2000

Collaborative Publications
Stay This Moment: Photographs of Sam Abell, Sam Abell and Robert E. Gilka, 1990

References 

 Jeffrey, Ian et al. (1997). The Photography Book. London:Phaidon Press Limited.

External links 
 Sam Abell's website
 Sam Abell's Photography
 National Geographic Biography

Landscape photographers
1945 births
Living people
20th-century American photographers
21st-century American photographers
University of Kentucky alumni
People from Sylvania, Ohio